The 2013–14 Nebraska Cornhuskers women's basketball team will represent University of Nebraska–Lincoln during the 2013–14 NCAA Division I women's basketball season. The Cornhuskers, led by 12th year head coach Connie Yori, play their home games at the newly Pinnacle Bank Arena and were members of the Big Ten Conference. They finished with a record of 26–7, 12–4 in Big Ten play to finish in third place. They won the Big Ten women's tournament for the first time in school history. They received an automatic bid to the NCAA women's tournament which they defeated Fresno State in the first round before falling to BYU in the second round to end their season.

Roster

Schedule

|-
!colspan=9 | Exhibition

|-
!colspan=9| Regular Season

|-
!colspan=9 | 2014 Big Ten women's tournament

|-
!colspan=9 | 2014 NCAA women's tournament

Source

Rankings

See also
2013–14 Nebraska Cornhuskers men's basketball team

References

Nebraska Cornhuskers women's basketball seasons
Nebraska
Nebraska
Cornhusk
Cornhusk